Mechanics of Advanced Composite Structures is a biannual peer-reviewed open-access scientific journal published by Semnan University. The editor-in-chief is Abdoulhossein Fereidoon (Semnan University). The journal covers all aspects of research on composite structures. It was established in 2014 and is abstracted and indexed in Scopus.

References

External links

Publications established in 2014
Quarterly journals
English-language journals
Creative Commons Attribution-licensed journals
Materials science journals